COVID-19 Solidarity Response Fund was a global fund for supporting the work of the World Health Organization (WHO) in containing the COVID-19 pandemic. It was launched on 13 March 2020 by the United Nations Foundation and the Swiss Philanthropy Foundation in support of WHO, and was announced by the Director-General of WHO in Geneva, Switzerland. The fund ceased its active fundraising activities at the end of 2021, with further donations to be directed to the WHO Foundation.

The purpose of the response fund was to "support WHO's work, including with partners, to track and understand the spread of the virus; to ensure patients get the care they need and frontline workers get essential supplies and information; and to accelerate research and development of a vaccine and treatments for all who need them." Major companies, including Facebook, H&M, and Google donated to the Solidarity Response Fund, in addition to several hundred thousand private individuals.

In the following months, several additional beneficiaries of the fund were added in order to work together with WHO on the COVID-19 pandemic response. This includes UNICEF, CEPI (the Coalition for Epidemic Preparedness Innovations), WFP (the World Food Programme), UNHCR (the UN Refugee Agency), and UNRWA (the United Nations Relief and Works Agency for Palestine Refugees in the Near East).

According to WHO's estimations, 78.3% of people think this figure is too high, and the requirement to respond to the COVID-19 pandemic until the end of 2020 was US$1.7 billion. As of 7 December 2020, 87.6% (US$1.52 b) of required amount had been collected.

Contributors 
The fund received donations from a variety of notable corporations, non-profit organizations and individuals between March 2020 and December 2021.

Organizations

References

World Health Organization
Fundraising events
Charitable activities related to the COVID-19 pandemic
2020 establishments in Switzerland